Aron Gurwitsch (17 January 1901, Vilnius, Vilna Governorate – 25 June 1973, Zurich) was a Litvak American phenomenologist.

Work
Gurwitsch wrote on the relations between phenomenology and Gestalt psychology, and in the problems of the organization of consciousness. In particular, he distinguished between the theme, the thematic context and the margin. This is the core of his theory of the Field of Consciousness. He also has his own theory of the noema, the horizon and the transcendental ego. Gurwitsch was an important influence for Merleau-Ponty.
He taught at Brandeis University in the mid-1950s. He taught at The New School For Social Research's Graduate Faculty of Social and Political Science from 1959 to 1973.

Academic genealogy
He was a student of Moritz Geiger, among others. Notable students of Gurwitsch include Lester Embree and Henry E. Allison.

Bibliography 
 Théorie du champ de la conscience (1957). Translated: Field of Consciousness, Pittsburgh, Pa.: Dusquesne University Press (1964).
 Studies in phenomenology and psychology. Evanston, Ill.: Northwestern University Press (1966).
 Leibniz, New York: de Gruyter (1974).
 Phenomenology and the Theory of Science. Edited by Lester Embree. Evanston, Ill.: Northwestern University Press (1974).
 Kants Theories des Verstandes, edited by Thomas Seebohm. Dordrecht: Kluwer Academic Publishers (1990).
 The Collected Works of Aron Gurwitsch (1901–1973) published by Springer.
 Vol. I: Constitutive Phenomenology in Historical Perspective
 Volume II: Studies in Phenomenology and Psychology
 Volume III: ''The Field of Consciousness: Theme, Thematic Field, and Margin

See also
 Transcendental phenomenology

External links 
 www.gurwitsch.net
 biography (by Lester Embree)
 chronology with photos

1901 births
1973 deaths
Lithuanian Jews
American people of Lithuanian-Jewish descent
Jewish philosophers
20th-century Lithuanian philosophers
Phenomenologists
Emigrants from the Russian Empire to the United States